Dammooru (also spelled as Dammur) is a village in the Hungund taluk of Bagalkot district in the Indian state of Karnataka.

Demographics
As of 2001 India census, Dammooru had a population of 1,494 with 755 males and 739 females and 243 Households.

Importance
Dammooru is famous for the ancient Dammur fort and natural waterfalls.

See also
Kudalasangama
Badami
Hungund
Bagalkot
Karnataka

References

Villages in Bagalkot district